In algebraic geometry, a degeneration (or specialization) is the act of taking a limit of a family of varieties. Precisely, given a morphism

of a variety (or a scheme) to a curve C with origin 0 (e.g., affine or projective line), the fibers

One then says the family  degenerates to the special fiber . The limiting process behaves nicely when  is a flat morphism and, in that case, the degeneration is called a flat degeneration. Many authors assume degenerations to be flat.

When the family  is trivial away from a special fiber; i.e.,  is independent of  up to (coherent) isomorphisms,  is called a general fiber.

Degenerations of curves 

In the study of moduli of curves, the important point is to understand the boundaries of the moduli, which amounts to understand degenerations of curves.

Stability of invariants 
Ruled-ness specializes. Precisely, Matsusaka'a theorem says
Let X be a normal irreducible projective scheme over a discrete valuation ring. If the generic fiber is ruled, then each irreducible component of the special fiber is also ruled.

Infinitesimal deformations 
Let D = k[ε] be the ring of dual numbers over a field k and Y a scheme of finite type over k. Given a closed subscheme X of Y, by definition, an embedded first-order infinitesimal deformation of X is a closed subscheme X of Y ×Spec(k) Spec(D) such that the projection X → Spec D is flat and has X as the special fiber.

If Y = Spec A and X = Spec(A/I) are affine, then an embedded infinitesimal deformation amounts to an ideal I of A[ε] such that A[ε]/ I is flat over D and the image of I in A = A[ε]/ε is I.

In general, given a pointed scheme (S, 0) and a scheme X, a morphism of schemes : X → S is called the deformation of a scheme X if it is flat and the fiber of it over the distinguished point 0 of S is X. Thus, the above notion is a special case when S = Spec D and there is some choice of embedding.

See also 
deformation theory
differential graded Lie algebra
Kodaira–Spencer map
Frobenius splitting
Relative effective Cartier divisor

References 

M. Artin, Lectures on Deformations of Singularities – Tata Institute of Fundamental Research, 1976

E. Sernesi: Deformations of algebraic schemes
M. Gross, M. Siebert, An invitation to toric degenerations
M. Kontsevich, Y. Soibelman: Affine structures and non-Archimedean analytic spaces, in: The unity of mathematics (P. Etingof, V. Retakh, I.M. Singer, eds.), 321–385, Progr. Math. 244, Birkh ̈auser 2006.
Karen E Smith, Vanishing, Singularities And Effective Bounds Via Prime Characteristic Local Algebra.
V. Alexeev, Ch. Birkenhake, and K. Hulek, Degenerations of Prym varieties, J. Reine Angew. Math. 553 (2002), 73–116.

External links 
http://mathoverflow.net/questions/88552/when-do-infinitesimal-deformations-lift-to-global-deformations

Algebraic geometry